Bewitched is an American television sitcom.

Bewitched may also refer to:

Film and video games
 Bewitched (1945 film), a film noir by Arch Oboler
 Bewitched (2005 film), comedy based on remaking the sitcom
Bewitched, a game for the VIC-20 by Imagine Software

Literature 
 The Bewitched, an 1852 novel by Jules Barbey d'Aurevilly

Music

Artists
 Bewitched (American band), a band led by former Sonic Youth drummer Bob Bert
 B*Witched, an Irish girl group

Albums
 B*Witched (album), a 1998 album by the group
 Bewitched (album), a 1994 album by Luna
 Bewitched (EP), a 1985 EP by Look Blue Go Purple
 Bewitched, a 1984 album by Andy Summers and Robert Fripp
 Bewitched - Music from the Motion Picture by George Fenton (2005) 
 Bewitched, a 1993 album by Laura Fygi

Songs
"Bewitched, Bothered and Bewildered", also "Bewitched", a 1941 song by Rodgers and Hart
 "Bewitched", a song by Candlemass from Nightfall
"Bewitched", a song by White Town from Socialism, Sexism & Sexuality